Knoweside railway station was a railway station serving the village of Knoweside, South Ayrshire, Scotland. The station was part of the Maidens and Dunure Light Railway.

History
The station opened on 17 May 1906. It closed on 1 December 1930, but reopened briefly between 4 July 1932 and 1 June 1933.

Today the site of the station is a caravan park. Near to the station is the Electric Brae.

References

Notes

Sources
 
 
 Article in British Railway Journal No 8 Summer 1985 Wild Swan Publications

Disused railway stations in South Ayrshire
Railway stations in Great Britain opened in 1906
Railway stations in Great Britain closed in 1930
Railway stations in Great Britain opened in 1932
Railway stations in Great Britain closed in 1933
Former Glasgow and South Western Railway stations